André Delcroix (born 20 September 1953) is a Belgian former racing cyclist. He won the Tour de Pologne in 1974.

References

External links
 

1953 births
Living people
Belgian male cyclists
People from Hoogstraten
Cyclists from Antwerp Province